Harding Academy is a K-12 private school in Searcy, Arkansas. It is affiliated with Harding University.  Like that institution, it is associated with the Churches of Christ and named in honor of an early minister of that fellowship, James A. Harding.

James Gurchiek is the current headmaster.
Bradley Francis is the High School Principal.
Matthew Henderson is the Elementary Principal.

Student life
Harding Academy is accredited by the National Christian School Association. Many students take Advanced Placement (AP) courses and successfully gain college credit while still enrolled in high school.

The FIRST LEGO League (Mindsweepers) team won the state championship in 2017 and 2021. The FIRST Robotics Competition team (Team 3937 Breakaway) won the 2014 Arkansas Regional and Louisiana Bayou Regional as well as the 2015 and 2017 Louisiana Bayou Regional. 

Every school day the students and faculty meet for chapel followed by a 45-minute bible study period that all students grades 7-12 attend. The school also participates in various community events including hosting the Wildcat Road Mile, Micah Rine 5k, and the Breakaway 10k.

Athletics
Harding Academy's mascot is the wildcat, and the school colors are red and white.

The Harding Academy Wildcats participate in the 3A Classification and 3A Region 2 Conference as sanctioned by the Arkansas Activities Association. Boys may participate in these sports:

 Football: Harding Academy football won three consecutive  state championships in 2019 and 2020 and 2021. The Wildcats won their first 3A Classification football state championship in 2012 with a 49–45 win over Glen Rose. They have previously won championships in 1976, 1977, 1983, and 2002. The junior high football team had an undefeated season in 2007.  They again had an undefeated season in 2012. In 2015, the Wildcats won their 6th State Championship.
 Cross country running
 Golf
 Basketball: The boys basketball team won the 3A classification state basketball championship in 2013 and 2021. 
 Tennis: The boys tennis teams have won three state championships (1974, 1984, 1986).
 Baseball: After just a few seasons the baseball team won the Arkansas AAA State Championship in 2008, the first time the school has won a state title in baseball (Bagley).  They then followed with more championships in 2013, 2017, and 2018. The baseball team also won the state championship in 2021
 Track
 Soccer: The boys soccer team won their first state championship in 2022.
Girls may participate in these sports:
 Volleyball: The volleyball team won a state volleyball championship in 2011.
 Basketball
 Track: Won three consecutive state championships in 2011, 2012, and 2013.  The team also won the state championship in 2019, 2021, and 2022.
 Cross country running: The girls cross country teams are 5-time state cross country champions (2000, 2001, 2002, 2004, 2011).
 Tennis: state doubles winner and overall state runners-up in 2012 
 Softball: 
 Golf
 Cheerleading
Soccer: The girls soccer team won the state championship in 2021 and 2022.

Academics
Harding Academy offers AP and Honors classes.  The school also requires all students (grades 7–12) to take a Bible class.

Notable alumni
 Michael Blue, investor 
 Stephen Mark Brown, vocalist
 Jeb Huckeba, professional football player

References

Sources
Anon. "Jordan Simpson."  The Daily Citizen (Searcy).  Online Edition.  Education Section.  May 31, 2008.  Accessed June 1, 2008.  
Bagley, Quinton. "WILDCATS WIN!" The Daily Citizen (Searcy).  Online Edition.  Sports Section.  May 17, 2008.  Accessed May 28, 2008.  (Report about H.A. the State Championship in baseball, filed from Fayetteville, AR, where the state finals were held.)

External links
Harding Academy

Educational institutions established in 1924
Schools in White County, Arkansas
Private high schools in Arkansas
Private middle schools in Arkansas
Private elementary schools in Arkansas
Harding University
Buildings and structures in Searcy, Arkansas
1924 establishments in Arkansas